Parkside railway station or Parkside station may refer to:

Parkside railway station (Derbyshire), the station on the heritage Derbyshire Dales Narrow Gauge Railway in England
Parkside railway station (Merseyside), an original station on the Liverpool and Manchester Railway in England
Parkside Halt railway station, a former station in the Scottish Highlands, United Kingdom
Parkside station, a former commuter railroad station in Long Island, New York
Parkside Avenue (BMT Brighton Line), a subway station in Brooklyn, New York, United States
Taraval and 28th Avenue station, a former streetcar stop in the Parkside neighborhood of San Francisco, California, United States

See also
Park station (disambiguation)